Seda Gurgenovna Tutkhalyan (born 15 July 1999) is a Russian artistic gymnast. She is the 2014 Youth Olympic Games Individual All-around champion and a 2016 Summer Olympics Team silver medalist.

Personal life 
Tutkhalyan was born July 15, 1999 in Gyumri, Armenia, and moved to Moscow early in childhood. Her father, Gurgen Tutkhalyan, was a four-time world champion for the Soviet Union in sambo martial arts, and her older brother, Vaik, currently competes for Belarus in the same sport.

Junior career 
2013 was Tutkhalyan's breakout year. At the Russian Junior Championships, she won team, all-around, vault, and uneven bars gold, floor exercise bronze, and placed seventh on balance beam. Later, at the Olympic Hopes competition, she won gold with her team and on vault, and silver in the all-around and on floor exercise. Her international debut came that winter, at the Gymnasiade in Brazil, where she won team gold, floor exercise bronze, and placed fourth on beam, fifth in the all-around and on vault, and eighth on bars.

In 2014, she competed at the Russian Championships in April, winning vault gold, team, all-around, and uneven bars silver, and placing fifth on beam and sixth on floor. She competed at the European Championships, she won gold with her team and placed fourth on vault, seventh in the all-around and on balance beam, and eighth on floor exercise. In early July, she competed at the Student Spartakiada, winning team, all-around, and vault gold, uneven bars bronze, and placed fourth on floor. She was then selected to represent Russia at the 2014 Youth Olympic Games in Nanjing, China; there, she won the all-around and uneven bars, silver on floor exercise, and placed fifth on vault.

Senior career 
Tutkhalyan became a senior elite gymnast in 2015. At her senior debut at the Russian National Championships in early March, she won three bronze medals, for all-around, vault and balance beam.

In June, Tutkhalyan was named to the Russian team for the 2015 European Games in Baku, with Aliya Mustafina and Viktoria Komova. Tutkhalyan won the gold medal with the team, and posted the second-highest all-around score in qualification, 57.332. However, the highest score was by her teammate Mustafina and only one gymnast per country could advance to the final at these games. Tutkhalyan did qualify for the vault final in second place with a score of 14.466 for two vaults, and for the balance beam final in first place with a score of 14.600. Tutkhalyan was named to the Russian team for the 2015 World Artistic Gymnastics Championships. She helped her team to a 4th-place finish and individually qualified to the all-around and balance beam finals. In the all-around final, she placed 15th, and in the balance beam final, she placed 6th.

In 1–10 April 2016; Tutkhalyan competed at the 2016 Russian Artistic Gymnastics Championships taking silver in all-around, team and won gold in vault finals. On 30 April – 1 May, she competed at the Osijek World Cup where she won silver in uneven bars and bronze in balance beam finals. She was named to the team at the European Championships and contributed to the Russian team's gold medal finish; however, she did not make any individual finals.

2016 Olympics

Tutkhalyan was named to the Russian Olympic team after Ksenia Afanasyeva's health problems relegated the latter gymnast to alternate and later forced her retirement from gymnastics. In qualifications, Tutkhalyan competed the all-around and qualified in 4th place to the all-around final with a score of 58.207. In the team final, she contributed a beam score of 14.766 and a floor score of 13.766 to the Russian team's silver medal finish.

In the all-around final, competing in the top group, Tutkhalyan began well with a vault score of 14.866 and a bars score of 15.033, and it appeared at that point that Seda would challenge her teammate Aliya Mustafina for a surprise bronze medal. However, these hopes began to dissipate on the beam, when she fell on her double-pike dismount after a mostly clean routine, receiving a score of 13.800, and multiple falls on floor, her last apparatus, left her with 10.966 on that event and a total all-around score of 54.665 for 22nd place. She had not made any event finals, although she was second reserve for the vault final.

Competitive history

International Scores

References

External links
 
 Seda Tutkhalyan at sportgymrus.ru 
 
 
 
 

1999 births
Living people
Sportspeople from Gyumri
Russian people of Armenian descent
Russian sportspeople of Armenian descent
Armenian emigrants to Russia
Russian female artistic gymnasts
Gymnasts at the 2014 Summer Youth Olympics
Junior artistic gymnasts
Gymnasts at the 2015 European Games
European Games medalists in gymnastics
European Games gold medalists for Russia
European Games silver medalists for Russia
Gymnasts at the 2016 Summer Olympics
Olympic gymnasts of Russia
Medalists at the 2016 Summer Olympics
Olympic silver medalists for Russia
Olympic medalists in gymnastics
Youth Olympic gold medalists for Russia
European champions in gymnastics